John Philbin (born April 27, 1960) is an American actor who is best known for his appearances in the films North Shore, Return of the Living Dead, Point Break and Tombstone.

Early life
Philbin began surfing at 12. He studied acting at the University of California, Santa Barbara, as well as being on the university's surf team.

Career
An accomplished surfer, Philbin has used this skill in films such as Point Break, The Boost, and North Shore. Some of his other films include Children of the Corn and The Return of the Living Dead.

Surfing instruction
Philbin gives surf training to actors to prepare them for film roles, one of the most notable being the surf instructor for actors in the film Blue Crush.

Personal life

2015 arrest
Philbin was arrested on February 28, 2015, after he brandished a loaded gun to his girlfriend. He pleaded no contest to a misdemeanor weapons charge and was sentenced to 30 days in county jail (credited with 26 days), plus 3 years' probation and complete a 52-week AA program and domestic violence classes.

Filmography

References

External links

1960 births
Living people
Male actors from California
20th-century American male actors
21st-century American male actors
American male film actors